Mamnun Hasan Emon, who is known by his stage name as Emon, is a Bangladeshi film actor and model. Emon started his career by modelling. He acted in several tvc's, dramas and later he started working in films and he is best known for his famous tvc add Banglalink with Monalisa, Nirab and Tinni. He made his debut with the 2007 film Daruchini Dip starring Riaz, Momo and Bindu.

Career
Emon began his career in Tauquir Ahmed's 2007 film Daruchini Dip. He earned widespread recognition in 2010 for his performance in the film Gohine Shobdo: Dark Renosance;  This performance won him several awards at the International Film Festival, South Asian Film Festival, and Silent River Film Festival. He achieved further success with his film Lal Tip: The Red Point.

In 2013, with Bangla Vision, he performed in a dramatic thriller in Qatar titled Valentine, appearing alongside Sarika and Shahnur. It was directed by M-SIB. M-SIB showed the pair of Emon and Sarika together for the first time on TV screens.

Personal life
Emon is married to Aysha Islam since 15 February 2009. The couple have two sons, Samin and Shayan.

Filmography

Television

Web series

Short film

Music video

Awards

References

External links
 
 Mamnun Hasan Emon on Facebook

1983 births
Bangladeshi male film actors
Living people
People from Dhaka
Bangladeshi male television actors